Saint Mary's Regional Medical Center is a for-profit hospital in Reno, Nevada. It is owned and operated by Prime Healthcare Services.

History
The Dominican Sisters of San Rafael opened Sister's Hospital in 1908. The sisters had been living in the area since 1877 and had previously opened Mount Saint Mary's Academy. In 1912, a new facility was added and the hospital was renamed Saint Mary's Hospital. Additions have since been added at that original site, leading to today's Saint Mary's Regional Medical Center.

Saint Mary's became an affiliate of Catholic Healthcare West in 2006. Saint Mary's lost money under CHW ownership and in 2012, the hospital was sold to the for-profit Prime Healthcare Services.

Prime Healthcare Services was investigated by the United States Department of Justice (DOJ) for Medicare fraud.

References

External links
 

1908 establishments in Nevada
Dignity Health
Hospital buildings completed in 1908
Catholic hospitals in North America
Hospitals established in 1908
Hospitals in Nevada
Prime Healthcare Services
Roman Catholic Diocese of Reno